The Mix Tape, Volume II: 60 Minutes of Funk is a mixtape by American DJ Funkmaster Flex. It was released on February 11, 1997 via Loud/RCA Records, serving as a sequel to his 1995 The Mix Tape Volume 1 (60 Minutes of Funk) and the second installment in his 60 Minute of Funk mixtape series. Like his previous Mix Tape release, this album is a compilation of freestyles and previously released songs mixed together by Funk Flex.

The album was a success, peaking at 19 on the Billboard 200, an 89-spot increase from his previous album, and No. 2 on the Top R&B/Hip-Hop Albums, held from the top spot by Erykah Badu's Baduizm. Less than two months after its release, the album was certified gold by the Recording Industry Association of America for sales of 500,000 copies, becoming the first of four consecutive gold albums for Flex.

Track listing

Charts

Weekly charts

Year-end charts

Certifications

References

External links

1997 albums
Loud Records albums
Funkmaster Flex albums
Hip hop compilation albums